Holy Family is a thriller drama television series created by Manolo Caro for Netflix. It stars Najwa Nimri and Alba Flores alongside Macarena Gómez, Ella Kweku, Carla Campra, Álex García, Iván Pellicer, and Álvaro Rico. It received a streaming release on 14 October 2022. It was renewed for a second season on 15 November 2022. Filming for the second season wrapped on 17 February 2023.

Plot 
The plot starts in Melilla in 1998. It later moves to the well-off neighborhood of Fuente del Berro. The relationship of friendship forged between different women (all mothers) is upended by the haunting past of one of them, Gloria (a purported single mother living with her son and her childminder Aitana) and a new arrival to the neighborhood.

Cast

Production 
Created by Manolo Caro, the series was written by Caro alongside Fernando Pérez and María Miranda. It is a Noc Noc cinema production. Shooting locations included Madrid and Melilla.

Release 
The 8-episode first season was released on 14 October, 2022. It was renewed for a second season on 15 November, 2022.

References

External links

2020s Spanish drama television series
2022 Spanish television series debuts 
Spanish-language Netflix original programming
Television shows filmed in Spain
Television shows set in Madrid
Television series set in 1998
Spanish thriller television series
Melilla in fiction
2020s LGBT-related drama television series
Gay-related television shows
Spanish LGBT-related television shows